The 2016–17 Professional Football League was the third highest division in Russian football. The Professional Football League is geographically divided into 5 zones.
The winners of each zone are automatically promoted into the National Football League. The bottom finishers of each zone lose professional status and are relegated into the Amateur Football League.

West

Teams and stadia

Rules

Format: for the 2016-17 season, the Russian Professional Football League West consists of 14 teams, each team plays the others twice on a home and away basis for a total of 26 games each, over 26 game weeks.

Points scored: 3 points for a win, 1 point for a draw, 0 points for a loss.

Rules for classification: 1. Points won; 2. Games won; 3. Points in head-to-head matches; 4. Games won in head-to-head matches; 5. Goal difference in head-to-head matches; 6. Goals scored in head-to-head matches; 7. Away goals in head-to-head matches; 8. Total goal difference; 9. Total goals scored; 10. Total away goals scored.

Relegation to the Professional Football League from the Football National League: 0-5 teams

Promotion from the Professional Football League to the Football National League: 1 team (Champion)

Relegation from the Professional Football League to the Amateur Football League: 1 team (last place)

Promotion to the Professional Football League from the Amateur Football League: no set number of teams to be promoted

Promotion and relegation of club second teams:
 Second teams (Dynamo-2 Moscow) cannot be promoted.
 If any of them finishes in a promotion spot, then the next best team in the final table is promoted in their place.
 Second teams are to be relegated regardless of their league position if their first team gets relegated to the Professional Football League.
 In such case and if the II team is above the relegation zone, the best placed team in the relegation zone keeps its place in Professional Football League instead.

Source:

Standings

Top scorers

Center

Teams and stadia

Rules

Format: for the 2016-17 season, the Russian Professional Football League West consists of 13 teams, each team plays the others twice on a home and away basis for a total of 24 games each, over 26 game weeks.

Points scored: 3 points for a win, 1 point for a draw, 0 points for a loss.

Rules for classification: 1. Points won; 2. Games won; 3. Points in head-to-head matches; 4. Games won in head-to-head matches; 5. Goal difference in head-to-head matches; 6. Goals scored in head-to-head matches; 7. Away goals in head-to-head matches; 8. Total goal difference; 9. Total goals scored; 10. Total away goals scored.

Relegation to the Professional Football League from the Football National League: 0-5 teams

Promotion from the Professional Football League to the Football National League: 1 team (Champion)

Relegation from the Professional Football League to the Amateur Football League: 1 team (last place)

Promotion to the Professional Football League from the Amateur Football League: no set number of teams to be promoted

Promotion and relegation of club second teams:
 Second teams (Arsenal-2 Tula) cannot be promoted.
 If any of them finishes in a promotion spot, then the next best team in the final table is promoted in their place.
 Second teams are to be relegated regardless of their league position if their first team gets relegated to the Professional Football League.
 In such case and if the II team is above the relegation zone, the best placed team in the relegation zone keeps its place in Professional Football League instead.

Source:

Standings

Top scorers

South

Teams and stadia

Rules

Format: for the 2016-17 season, the Russian Professional Football League South consists of 16 teams, each team plays the others twice on a home and away basis for a total of 30 games each, over 30 game weeks.

Points scored: 3 points for a win, 1 point for a draw, 0 points for a loss.

Rules for classification: 1. Points won; 2. Games won; 3. Points in head-to-head matches; 4. Games won in head-to-head matches; 5. Goal difference in head-to-head matches; 6. Goals scored in head-to-head matches; 7. Away goals in head-to-head matches; 8. Total goal difference; 9. Total goals scored; 10. Total away goals scored.

Relegation to the Professional Football League from the Football National League: 0-5 teams

Promotion from the Professional Football League to the Football National League: 1 team (Champion)

Relegation from the Professional Football League to the Amateur Football League: 1 team (last place)

Promotion to the Professional Football League from the Amateur Football League: no set number of teams to be promoted

Promotion and relegation of club second teams:
 Second teams (Krasnodar-2 and Kuban-2) cannot be promoted.
 If any of them finishes in a promotion spot, then the next best team in the final table is promoted in their place.
 Second teams are to be relegated regardless of their league position if their first team gets relegated to the Professional Football League.
 In such case and if the II team is above the relegation zone, the best placed team in the relegation zone keeps its place in Professional Football League instead.

Source:

Standings

Top scorers

Ural-Povolzhye

Teams and stadia

Standings

Top scorers

East

Teams and stadia

Rules

Format: for the 2016-17 season, the Russian Professional Football League East consists of 6 teams, each team plays the others 4 times on a 2 at home and 2 away basis for a total of 20 games each, over 20 game weeks.

Points scored: 3 points for a win, 1 point for a draw, 0 points for a loss.

Rules for classification: 1. Points won; 2. Games won; 3. Points in head-to-head matches; 4. Games won in head-to-head matches; 5. Goal difference in head-to-head matches; 6. Goals scored in head-to-head matches; 7. Away goals in head-to-head matches; 8. Total goal difference; 9. Total goals scored; 10. Total away goals scored.

Relegation to the Professional Football League from the Football National League: 0-5 teams

Promotion from the Professional Football League to the Football National League: 1 team (Champion)

Relegation from the Professional Football League to the Amateur Football League: 1 team (last place)

Promotion to the Professional Football League from the Amateur Football League: no set number of teams to be promoted

Source:

Standings

Top scorers

References

2016-17
3
Rus